Truth & Salvage Co. is the 2010 debut album by rock band Truth & Salvage Co. It features the single, "Call Back."

Reception

The initial critical reception of the Truth & Salvage Co. was mostly positive, though sales were slow to build. The band garnered a considerable amount of early interest in their debut by performing in the opening slot for producer Chris Robinson's band The Black Crowes on their 2009 tour of the United States.

Track listing

Additional tracks

"Them Jeans" was released as an exclusive iTunes bonus track along with the original album on May 25, 2010.

Personnel 
 Bill "Smitty" Smith: Vocals, drums
 Scott Kinnebrew: Vocals, guitars, lap steel
 Tim Jones: Vocals, guitars
 Walker Young: Vocals, piano, B-3 organ
 Adam Grace: B-3 organ, piano, mellotron, wurlitzer
 Joe Edel: bass
 Luther Dickinson: guitar on "Pure Mountain Angel"
 George Stanford: guitar on "She Really Does It For Me"
 Franky Perez: guitar on "Call Back" and "Brothers, Sons & Daughters"
 Brian Wright: contributions on "Old Piano"
 Katy Perry: vocals, guitar on "Old Piano"

Additional credits 
 Produced by: Chris Robinson
 "See Her" and "Rise Up" produced by: Paul Stacey
 "Hail Hail" produced by: Paul Stacey & Chris Robinson
 Engineered by: Beau Raymond & John Hanlon
 Assistant engineer: Bill Mims
 Mixed by: Paul Stacey at Strangeways Studio, London
 Assistant mixer: Ben Hampson
 Mastered by: John Paterno
 Recorded at: Stagg Street Studios, Kingsize Soundlabs and Sunset Sound, Los Angeles CA
 Management: Pete Angelus - Angelus Entertainment
 Album art & design: Katie Crawford
 Photography: Matt Mendenhall, Craig Gorkiewicz, Jonathan Dubuque

References

2010 debut albums